Romana may refer to:

People
 Romana (name), a feminine given name, including a list of people with the name
 Romana (singer) (Romana Panić, born 1975), a Serbian pop singer
 Romaña, a Spanish-language surname, including a list of people with the name
 Romaña (guerrilla leader), Colombian guerrilla leader

Places
Romana, Azerbaijan
Romana, Sardinia, Italy
Româna, Balş, Olt County, Romania

Other uses
 Romana (Jordanes), a 6th-century history book
 Română, the Romanian language, which calls itself limba română
 Romana (Doctor Who), fictional character in the TV series 
 Romana FC, a former Dominican Republic football team 
 Romana Film, an Italian film production company

See also

La Romana (disambiguation)
Roma (disambiguation)
Romaña's sign, a sign of Chagas disease